Ameerpet metro station is an interchange metro station between the Red Line and Blue Line of the Hyderabad Metro. Ameerpet metro station is one of the busiest metro stations in Hyderabad with daily footfalls of around 32,000 commuters.

History 

The station was opened in 29 November 2017.

On 22 September 2019, a 27-year-old woman named K Mounika died in a freak accident when a concrete slab, which peeled off when she took shelter during rain, fell off from a height of 9 metres at pillar number A-1053 of the Ameerpet metro station and hit her head. She was admitted to Aster Prime Hospital in Ameerpet where she succumbed to her injuries. Hyderabad metro authority paid  20 lakhs as compensation to the victim's family. L&T said it would provide another Rs 15 lakh from an insurance company and job to a family member. A case was registered against L&T under Section 304-A (Negligence causing death) of the IPC. A day after the incident, Minister for Municipal Administration and Urban Development K. T. Rama Rao instructed Hyderabad Metro Rail authorities to conduct a thorough investigation and check all structures and facilities in detail to prevent such an incident from occurring again.

Facilities 
Ameerpet metro station is a busy commercial spot where there are several outlets selling apparel, biryani, shawarma, tea etc. L&THMRL has set up free wifi access units for commuters at Ameerpet metro station, in association with ACT Fibernet, as part of a pilot project.

References

Hyderabad Metro stations
2017 establishments in Telangana
Railway stations in India opened in 2017